USDL may refer to:

Unified Service Description Language
United States Department of Labor
Unix System Development Laboratory